The Noma Literacy Prize is a UNESCO award. It goes to the group or individual who has done most to combat illiteracy. It is one of a series of Noma Prizes. It was founded in 1980 by Shoichi Noma, the president of the publishing firm Kodansha, Japan's largest publisher of literature and manga.

Select recipients

 1985 — NUFI Institution of the Republic of Cameroun.  
 1993 — Indian National Federation of UNESCO Clubs and Associations (INFUCA)
 1999 — India's National Literacy Mission Programme.

See also
Noma Prize
UNESCO Nadezhda K. Krupskaya literacy prize
UNESCO Confucius Prize for Literacy
UNESCO King Sejong Literacy Prize

References

External links
 History of UNESCO literacy prizes

UNESCO awards
Noma Prize
Awards established in 1980
1980 establishments in Japan
Literacy-related awards